This is a list of monitors of the Royal Navy of the United Kingdom.

Key

Humber-class

The Humber-class monitors were three river monitors under construction for the Brazilian Navy in Britain in 1913, all three were taken over by the Royal Navy shortly before the outbreak of the First World War and were commissioned as small monitors, seeing extensive service during the war.

Abercrombie-class

The ''Abercrombie-class monitors  came about when Bethlehem Steel in the United States, the contracted supplier of the main armament for the Greek battleship  being built in Germany, instead offered to sell the four 14"/45 caliber gun twin gun turrets to the Royal Navy on 3 November 1914, the ships were laid down and launched within six months, seeing service throughout the war.

Lord Clive-class

The Lord Clive-class monitors, sometimes referred to as the General Wolfe-class, were built to meet the need for more shore bombardment ships, using twin  gun turrets taken from decommissioned Majestic-class pre-dreadnought battleships.

Marshal Ney-class

Gorgon-class

The Gorgon-class monitors were originally built as coastal defence ships for the Royal Norwegian Navy, but requisitioned for British use.

M15-class

M29-class

The M29-class monitors were five ships ordered in March 1915, as part of the War Emergency Programme of ship construction.

Erebus-class

The Erebus-class monitors were two ships mounting a single twin BL 15 inch Mk I naval gun turret. They saw active service in World War I off the Belgian coast, were placed in reserve between the wars then served in World War II, with Terror being lost in 1941 and Erebus surviving to be scrapped in 1946.

Roberts-class

The Roberts''-class monitors were two ships mounting a single twin BL 15 inch Mk I naval gun turret built during the Second World War, featuring shallow draught for operating inshore, broad beam to give stability and a high observation platform to observe fall of shot.

References

Monitors
 
Royal Navy monitors
Royal Navy monitors